Robert Lloyd Jenkins (Cox) (born December 30, 1963 in San Francisco, California) is a former American football offensive lineman in the National Football League for the Los Angeles Rams, the Los Angeles Raiders and the Oakland Raiders.

Living people
1963 births
Players of American football from San Francisco
American football offensive linemen
UCLA Bruins football players
Los Angeles Rams players
Los Angeles Raiders players
Oakland Raiders players